Buidhe Bheinn (886 m) is a mountain in the Northwest Highlands of Scotland. It lies between Glen Shiel and Loch Hourn.

A rugged mountain, it can either be climbed from the Kinloch Hourn side or from Kintail to the north. Due to its remoteness, the peak makes for a long excursion in either direction.

References

Mountains and hills of the Northwest Highlands
Marilyns of Scotland
Corbetts